Rosemary Bank is a seamount approximately  west of Scotland, located in the Rockall Trough, in the northeast Atlantic.  It was discovered in 1930 by the survey vessel HMS Rosemary, from which it takes its name. It is one of only three seamounts known in Scottish waters.

Rosemary Bank hosts a range of important habitats including deep sea sponge aggregations and cold water coral. Many species of fish, including orange roughy, blue ling, leafscale gulper shark and Portuguese dogfish are also found here. In 2014 the bank was declared a Nature Conservation Marine Protected Area (NCMPA) in order to protect the sponge aggregations, and the cenozoic marine geomorphology of the seabed. The designation was withdrawn in 2020, when it was replaced by the West of Scotland Marine Protected Area, which covers a much larger area.

The feature originated about 70 million years ago, as a result of volcanic activity. Around its base lies a thin "moat", where the sea-bottom is up  lower than the surrounding terrain.

References

External link

Seamounts of the Atlantic Ocean
Cretaceous volcanoes